is a professional Japanese baseball player. He plays infielder for the Yokohama DeNA BayStars.

External links

 NPB.com

1993 births
Living people
Baseball people from Okayama Prefecture
Japanese baseball players
Nippon Professional Baseball infielders
Yokohama DeNA BayStars players